Macaroni art, sometimes referred to as macaroni crafts or pasta art, is artwork that is made of dry macaroni or other pasta. The works commonly consist of individual pieces of macaroni glued to a surface to produce a mosaic. However, works may take the form of sculptures.

This type of art is produced during arts and crafts classes at pre-school. Today, it has evolved to become an artform practiced by adults.

In popular culture
Pasta art was used to advertise a Nancy Sinatra concert at the world famous Fillmore Auditorium in San Francisco. The art the poster was made from is composed entirely of Pasta e Fagioli (pasta and beans). Alphabet pasta spells out the lyrics for her hit "These Boots Are Made For Walking".  

Another example of pasta art was featured in an episode of the television sitcom Seinfeld. Cosmo Kramer produced a small sculpture made of fusilli called "Fusili Jerry".

References

External links

Artistic techniques
Decorative arts
Composition in visual art